UAV Navigation is a company based in Madrid, Spain, that specializes in the design and production of guidance, navigation, and control solutions for Unmanned Aerial Vehicles (UAVs). The company was established in 2004 and has become one of the most experienced manufacturers of autopilots in Spain. UAV Navigation develops flight control solutions for various types of UAVs, including helicopters, airplanes, and Vertical Take-Off and Landing (VTOL) UAVs. In addition, the company also designs and manufactures Attitude and Heading Reference Systems (AHRS).

UAV Navigation achieved a significant milestone in Spanish aviation history by being the first company to carry out a flight beyond the line of sight in Spain.

Products 
UAV Navigation develops all the essential components required for the autonomous operation of UAVs, from the ground control station control software called Visionair to the onboard components.

Among these components on board we highlight both the autopilots for unmanned systems and the AHRS that can be used in unmanned aviation and in aiming and stabilization tasks.

Autopilots 
UAV Navigation designs a family of autopilots called VECTOR, which includes the VECTOR-400 and the VECTOR-600. The VECTOR-400 is an autopilot specially designed for unmanned aerial targets, while the VECTOR-600 is the company's most advanced autopilot that can be used in helicopters, airplanes, VTOLs, UAVs, and advanced aerial targets.

AHRS 
The UAV Navigation AHRS family is called POLAR. The POLAR family consists of the POLAR-300 and the POLAR-500. Both systems can be used in unmanned aviation and aiming tasks. The POLAR AHRS, which is included in the VECTOR autopilots, is capable of flying without a GNSS signal using inertial sensors, a technology known as dead reckoning.

Other projects 
The company has several other noteworthy projects, including the development of a fully automatic autorotation maneuver for rotary-wing platforms, low altitude and high-speed flight for aerial targets, and its R&D project, Visual Navigation System.

Recent developments 
UAV Navigation recently announced its agreement with Tecnobit, another Spanish firm, to enhance the Spanish contribution in the project of the Future Combat Air System (FCAS). In 2021, the Oesía Group acquired the company.

Conclusion 
UAV Navigation has become one of the leading companies in providing advanced guidance, navigation, and control solutions for UAVs. The company's cutting-edge products and projects have made a significant contribution to the development of unmanned aerial systems. UAV Navigation's recent acquisition by the Oesía Group indicates that the company is poised for continued growth and innovation in the future.

References

External links 

 Official Website